Maurice Ervin "Jerry" Pringle (8 November 1910 – 9 February 1991) was a Liberal party member of the House of Commons of Canada. Born in Dugald, Manitoba, he was a business consultant, director and hatcheryman by career.

He was first elected at the Fraser Valley East riding in the 1968 general election and served only one term, the 28th Canadian Parliament, before being defeated at the riding in the 1972 and 1974 elections.

External links
 

1910 births
1991 deaths
Members of the House of Commons of Canada from British Columbia
Liberal Party of Canada MPs
People from Dugald, Manitoba